NK Ljubuški is a football club from Ljubuški, Bosnia and Herzegovina. The team plays in the third tier Second League of the Federation of Bosnia and Herzegovina (South), and plays its games at Babovac Stadium.

History
The club was founded in 2005 under the name NK Bigeste, named after the Roman camp near Ljubuški. In 2019 the club changed its name to NK Ljubuški

Honours
Međužupanijska liga ZHŽ i HBŽ: 1
 2010, 2009
Second League of the Federation of Bosnia and Herzegovina (South): ?
 2011, 2012

References

Association football clubs established in 1937
Football clubs in Bosnia and Herzegovina
Croatian football clubs in Bosnia and Herzegovina
Sport in the Federation of Bosnia and Herzegovina
bs:NK Bigeste Ljubuški
de:HNK Ljubuški
fr:HNK Ljubuški
lt:HNK Ljubuški
Sport in Ljubuški